In 2003 Banco Atlántico became part of the Banco Sabadell Group.

History
1901: Shortly after Cuba achieved its independence from Spain, José and Francisco Nonell y Feliu, who had been running a Cambio in Cuba since 1885, moved their business to Barcelona.  There they joined with local merchants to found a bank, Nonell, Rovira y Matas, to facilitate the investment in local securities of money that Catalans were repatriating from Cuba. 
1917: The bank changed its name to Nonell Hermanos.
1920s: The bank's name became Banca Nonell.
1946: Claudio Güell y Churruca, Count of Ruiseñada, took over the bank and renamed it Banco Atlántico.
1961: Güell's descendants sold their shares to a new group of investors.
At some point Continental Illinois Bank owned part of Banco Atlántico, but eventually Rumasa, a holding company owned by José María Ruiz Mateos, came to own the bank. 
1975: Banco Atlántico established an agency in New York that it closed in 2001.
1983: The Spanish Socialist government of Felipe González and Miguel Boyer nationalized Rumasa, including Atlántico. Rumasa, which owned 20 banks and some 300 other companies, had failed and was too large for the Corporación Bancaria to deal with.  By this time, Banco Atlántico was the 10th largest bank in Spain, with 172 branches at home.  It also had the agency in New York and a branch in Grand Cayman, two subsidiaries in Switzerland and Panama, and representative offices in eight countries.
1984: Arab Banking Corporation (ABC; 70%), with BBVA and Allianz, acquired Atlántico from the government. Thereafter, Atlántico added private banking subsidiaries in the Bahamas, Gibraltar, and Monaco, while disposing of the one in Switzerland.  Then Banco Exterior replaced BBVA and Allianz as shareholders. 
1999 BBVA returned to partial ownership of Atlántico after it acquired Argentaria, which the Spanish government had created to combine several banks, including Banco Exterior.
2003: Banco Sabadell, beating out bids from several banks including Barclays Bank and Caixa Geral de Depositos of Portugal, acquired and absorbed Banco Atlántico.

References 

Companies based in Barcelona
Banco Sabadell
Banks established in 1901
Defunct banks of Spain
Banks disestablished in 2003